Eveli Peterson (born 19 October 1967) is a retired Estonian biathlete. She competed at the 1992 Winter Olympics and the 1994 Winter Olympics.

References

External links
 

1967 births
Living people
Biathletes at the 1992 Winter Olympics
Biathletes at the 1994 Winter Olympics
Estonian female biathletes
Olympic biathletes of Estonia
Place of birth missing (living people)